Krailling is a municipality in the district of Starnberg in Bavaria, Germany.

Notable residents 

 The folk actor Gustl Bayrhammer (1922-1993) died in Krailling and was buried there.
 The sculptor Rudolf Belling (1886-1972) lived and died in Krailling.
 The architect Martin Dülfer (1859-1942) lived in Krailling.
 The baritone Hermann Prey (1929-1998) lived in Krailling,  died here and was buried in the Kraillinger cemetery.

References

Starnberg (district)